Wilfholme is a hamlet in the East Riding of Yorkshire, England.

A nine-year-old dressage horse, Faldo, trained for nine months at Wilfholme, was bought in 2010 by the production company for Steven Spielberg's film War Horse to play one of the film's two horses in the role of Topthorn.

In 2010 local farmers expressed concern at the Environment Agency's possible decision to stop maintaining water pumping stations and flood banks at Wilfholme, Tickton and Hempholme, which they felt would increase the risk of flooding to arable and urban areas. In 2009 the Agency had reverted plans to end this maintenance, a decision supported by local Beverley and Holderness MP Graham Stuart.

References

External links

"Wilfholme", Driffield.co.uk. Retrieved 22 July 2013
"Wilfholme Landing", Canalplan.org.uk. Retrieved 22 July 2013

Villages in the East Riding of Yorkshire